English Nature was the United Kingdom government agency that promoted the conservation of wildlife, geology and wild places throughout England between 1990 and 2006. It was a non-departmental public body funded by the Department for Environment, Food and Rural Affairs (DEFRA) and gave statutory advice, grants and issued licences.

The Nature Conservancy Council (NCC) (formerly the Nature Conservancy) was established by the National Parks and Access to the Countryside Act 1949 to cover nature conservation issues across the whole of Great Britain. The NCC was split into four by the Environmental Protection Act 1990—its English duties being given to English Nature. In Scotland, its functions were merged with those of the Countryside Commission for Scotland to form Scottish Natural Heritage, and similarly in Wales there was a merger to form the Countryside Council for Wales. A much smaller body, the Joint Nature Conservation Committee (JNCC), supported all three agencies. The English functions of the Countryside Commission went to the newly formed Countryside Agency.

English Nature worked closely with the JNCC and the equivalent bodies for Scotland, Wales, and Northern Ireland (the Northern Ireland Environment Agency) to bring a consistent approach to nature conservation throughout the United Kingdom and towards fulfilling its international obligations.

The agency ceased to exist in October 2006 following a review by Lord Haskins, enacted in the Natural Environment and Rural Communities Act 2006. It was integrated with parts of both the Rural Development Service and the Countryside Agency from 1 October 2006, to form a new body called Natural England.

References

External links
Natural England
National Nature Reserves, archived in August 2006

 
Conservation in England
Environmental organisations based in England
Defunct organisations based in England
Defunct public bodies of the United Kingdom
Environmental organizations established in 1990
Government agencies established in 1990
Government agencies disestablished in 2006
1990 establishments in England
2006 disestablishments in England